The 1962 Kansas City Athletics season was the eighth season in Kansas City, and the 62nd in franchise history.  It involved the Athletics finishing ninth in the American League with a record of 72 wins and 90 losses, 24 games behind the World Series Champion New York Yankees.  The A's were last in the American League in paid attendance.

Offseason 
 October 11, 1961: Stan Johnson, Bobby Prescott and Jay Ward were traded by the Athletics to the Los Angeles Dodgers for Gordie Windhorn and Bill Lajoie (minors).
 December 15, 1961: Lou Klimchock and Bob Shaw were traded by the Athletics to the Milwaukee Braves for Joe Azcue, Ed Charles and Manny Jiménez.
 Prior to 1962 season: Don Williams was acquired by the Athletics from the Chicago White Sox.

Regular season 
 April 22, 1962: Future Basketball Hall of Famer Dave DeBusschere made his major league baseball debut for the Chicago White Sox in a game against the Athletics. He pitched one inning and gave up one base on balls.
 August 26, 1962: Jack Kralick threw the first no-hitter in Minnesota Twins history against the Athletics. The Twins beat the Athletics by a score of 1–0.

Season standings

Record vs. opponents

Roster

Player stats

Batting

Starters by position 
Note: Pos = Position; G = Games played; AB = At bats; H = Hits; Avg. = Batting average; HR = Home runs; RBI = Runs batted in

Other batters 
Note: G = Games played; AB = At bats; H = Hits; Avg. = Batting average; HR = Home runs; RBI = Runs batted in

Pitching

Starting pitchers 
Note: G = Games pitched; IP = Innings pitched; W = Wins; L = Losses; ERA = Earned run average; SO = Strikeouts

Other pitchers 
Note: G = Games pitched; IP = Innings pitched; W = Wins; L = Losses; ERA = Earned run average; SO = Strikeouts

Relief pitchers 
Note: G = Games pitched; W = Wins; L = Losses; SV = Saves; ERA = Earned run average; SO = Strikeouts

Farm system

References

External links
1962 Kansas City Athletics team page at Baseball Reference
1962 Kansas City Athletics team page at www.baseball-almanac.com

Oakland Athletics seasons
Kansas City Athletics season
1962 in sports in Missouri